Sammy Job Magalefa (born 26 April 1978) is a South African former footballer who played professionally as a midfielder in Greece and South Africa. He earned two caps and scored one goal for the South African national team, and was named to the squad for the 2002 COSAFA Cup.

Career
Born in Soweto, Magalefa played for ten seasons in the Premier Soccer League, with Wits University, Supersport United and Jomo Cosmos.

In January 2004, he began a six-month stint in Greece, but he made just four league appearances for Aris Thessaloniki before returning to South Africa.

In December 2007, Magalefa suffered a knee injury and didn't make another appearance for Jomo Cosmos for the remainder of the season. The club were relegated and his contract was cancelled in August 2008.

References 

1978 births
Living people
South African soccer players
Bidvest Wits F.C. players
SuperSport United F.C. players
Jomo Cosmos F.C. players
Aris Thessaloniki F.C. players
Association football midfielders